Acraea bailundensis is a butterfly in the family Nymphalidae. It is found in Angola and the Democratic Republic of the Congo (Lualaba).

Taxonomy
It is a member of the Acraea cepheus species group. See also Pierre & Bernaud, 2014.

References

Butterflies described in 1918
bailundensis